The Bosnia and Herzegovina national under-18 and under-19 basketball team is the national representative for Bosnia and Herzegovina in international under-18 and under-19 basketball competitions. They are organized by the Basketball Federation of Bosnia and Herzegovina.  The team competes at the FIBA U18 European Championship, with the opportunity to qualify for the FIBA Under-19 World Cup.

FIBA U18 European Championship

FIBA Under-19 World Cup

See also
Bosnia and Herzegovina national basketball team
Bosnia and Herzegovina national under-20 basketball team
Bosnia and Herzegovina national under-16 and under-17 basketball team

References

External links
Official website (in Bosnian)
FIBA profile

 
Men's national under-18 basketball teams
Men's national under-19 basketball teams